The Battle of Wambaw was an engagement of the American Revolutionary War fought on February 24, 1782 near Charleston, South Carolina. The British engaged and defeated an American force of dragoons and infantry near Charleston. The British claimed to kill 40 and capture 4 Americans, while the Americans claimed not to know their losses apart from 35 horses.

Sources

1782 in the United States
Berkeley County, South Carolina
History of Charleston, South Carolina
Conflicts in 1782
Wambaw
Wambaw
1782 in South Carolina
18th-century in Charleston, South Carolina